The Kiribati national football team represents the country of Kiribati in international association football. It is fielded by the Kiribati Islands Football Federation, the governing body of football in Kiribati, and competes as an associate member of the Oceania Football Confederation (OFC), which encompasses the countries of Oceania. Kiribati played their first international match on 30 August 1983 in a 24–0 loss to Fiji in Suva.

Kiribati have only competed in Pacific Games, and all players who have played in at least one match, either as a member of the starting eleven or as a substitute, are listed below. Each player's details include his playing position while with the team, the number of caps earned and goals scored in all international matches, and details of the first and most recent matches played in. The names are initially ordered by number of caps (in descending order), then by date of debut, then by alphabetical order. All statistics are correct up to and including the match played on 5 September 2011.

Key

Players

References

Kiribati international footballers
Association football player non-biographical articles